The 2014 Tequila Patrón Sports Car Showcase at Long Beach was a sports car race held on the Long Beach Street Circuit in California, United States, on 11–12 April 2014 as part of the Long Beach Grand Prix event weekend.  The race was the third round of the inaugural Tudor United SportsCar Championship season and held exclusively for the Prototype and GT Le Mans categories, the first such event in the history of the series to not feature all four classes.  Scott Pruett and Memo Rojas followed their 2014 12 Hours of Sebring victory with a win at Long Beach, and giving Chip Ganassi Racing their second victory in the history of the sports car event.  Wayne Taylor Racing and Action Express Racing's Chevrolet Corvette DPs completed the race podium.  Jan Magnussen and Antonio García earned Corvette Racing their first GTLM category win of the season, as well as the first win for the Chevrolet Corvette C7.R.

Race

Race result
Class winners are indicated with bold.

References

2014 in sports in California
2014 United SportsCar Championship season
April 2014 sports events in the United States